The 2020 NCAA Division I FBS football season was the 151st season of college football games in the United States. Organized by the National Collegiate Athletic Association (NCAA) at its highest level of competition, the Football Bowl Subdivision it began on September 3, 2020.

The season was heavily impacted by the COVID-19 pandemic in the United States; all of the Power Five conferences initially announced plans to play a fall football season beginning on August 29, but greatly reducing non-conference games to limit the extent of interstate travel. The ACC, Big 12, and SEC, as well as several other Group of Five conferences, began their seasons in September (though with some conferences delaying their start, and all "Week 0" kickoff games were scratched due to the aforementioned restrictions on non-conference play), while independent Notre Dame agreed to play a full conference schedule with the ACC.

In August, the Big Ten, Pac-12, MAC, Mountain West, and several independents announced that they would delay their football seasons indefinitely due to concerns regarding the pandemic, targeting the possibility of playing in the spring of 2021 instead. By late September, however, the four conferences had reversed their decisions and announced plans to play shortened seasons.

Aside from all-star games, the postseason concluded on January 11, 2021, with the College Football Playoff (CFP) National Championship at Hard Rock Stadium in Miami Gardens, Florida; this was the seventh season of the College Football Playoff championship system. Some postseason activities, including the final CFP rankings and the Heisman Trophy nominations, were delayed in order to provide flexibility for conferences to finish delayed seasons in mid-December. A number of bowl games were canceled due to recommendations by local health officials, or because they were unable to secure teams after multiple programs opted out of bowl games due to COVID-19 concerns. Additionally due to COVID-19, the Rose Bowl was played outside of Pasadena, California for the first time since 1942, while the New Mexico Bowl was played in Texas.

Conference realignment

Membership changes

Rule changes
The following playing rule changes were approved by the NCAA Playing Rules Oversight Panel for 2020:
 Players ejected for targeting will now be considered "disqualified" and be permitted to remain in the bench area instead of returning to the locker room.  Players ejected for other reasons (two unsportsmanlike conduct penalties, fighting, contact with officials, etc.) will continue to return to the locker room.
 Restricting the number of players on a team wearing the same uniform number to two; such players still cannot be on the field at the same time and must play different positions.
 Including the number "0" as a legal uniform number.
 Extending the official's jurisdiction prior to kickoff from 60 to 90 minutes, requiring a coach from each team be on the field during warm-ups, and identifying each player by number.
 Defensive teams are allowed to briefly have twelve players on the field to anticipate the offensive formation, however having twelve (or more) players on the field at the snap is a live-ball five-yard penalty for illegal substitution. Previously this foul was a dead-ball foul, called if the defense had twelve (or more) players on the field for at least three seconds. 
 Adopting as a guideline a maximum of 2 minutes for instant replay reviews. Exceptions will be allowed in "exceptionally complicated" or end-of-game situations.
 On personal fouls and unsportsmanlike conduct penalties committed by the defense during a play that results in a touchdown or after a touchdown but before the try, the offense has the option to enforce the penalty on the try, the ensuing kickoff, or on the succeeding spot (if in overtime).
 If the game clock expires at the end of a half, replay determines that time was remaining, and the game situation calls for the clock to start on the referee's signal, the half ends unless the replay determines that the clock should have stopped with 3 or more seconds left.

Other headlines
 February 18 – The NCAA announced that it was considering a proposal that would allow student-athletes in all sports a one-time waiver to transfer to a new school without having to sit out a season. This would place all NCAA sports under the same transfer rules; currently, first-time transfers are only required to sit out a season in baseball, men's and women's basketball, football, and men's ice hockey. The existing criteria for the waiver would be extended to these five sports—namely, a player must receive a transfer release from his or her previous school, leave that school academically eligible, maintain academic progress at the new school, and not be under any disciplinary suspension.
 February 20 – Pitt's football program has been placed on three years' probation as part of a series of violations announced by the Division I Committee on Infractions, which also included violations from their men's basketball team and former head coach Kevin Stallings. The football infractions result from a scheme where non-coaching "quality control" staffers performed coaching duties. If people from outside the football program were present at practice, music would be played to alert the staffers to their presence so they could leave. Pat Narduzzi was present at a football practice these three staff members performed coaching duties and was ordered to be held out of practice for two days in August. The school received other sanctions.
 February 26 – The new LA Bowl was announced on February 26, matching the Mountain West's No. 1 team against the Pac-12's No. 5. Beginning in December, the game will be held at SoFi Stadium, the new 70,240-seat home of the Los Angeles Chargers and Rams in Inglewood, California. The LA Bowl is locked in at SoFi from 2020 to 2025.
 December 3 – The Knight Commission, a non-NCAA group backing college athletics reform whose membership includes many university presidents and former athletic directors, recommended that FBS football be separated from the NCAA, with FBS programs becoming part of a new body that would take over all roles that the NCAA now assumes with respect to that sport. All other sports at FBS schools would remain under NCAA governance, and the NCAA would continue to govern all lower levels of football, including FCS.

Impact of the COVID-19 pandemic

Season preparations 
Multiple universities and conferences had already canceled their spring football games as part of the wider, nationwide suspension of organized sports and athletics due to the COVID-19 pandemic in the United States. On March 13, the NCAA announced a suspension of all Division I on-campus and off-campus recruiting until April 15. In regards to its impact on the regular season, NCAA president Mark Emmert stated on May 8 that individual decisions on fall semester sports would likely begin to appear as early as June or around July 4. He suggested that the operation of athletics programs would depend on students being present on-campus to a degree (but not necessarily "up and running in the full normal model"), explaining that "you have to treat the health and well-being of the athletes at least as much as the regular students", but that "this is going to be a very unusual school year, and we just have to make the best of it".

The NCAA Division I Council prohibited on-campus activities through May 31; on May 20, the Council voted to end the moratorium and allow voluntary on-campus activity in football and basketball to begin June 1, subject to new safety protocols. On June 17, the Division I Council approved a timetable for a season assumed to begin September 5, including beginning non-voluntary training activities on July 13.

On June 24, USA Today reported that at least 37 FBS schools had reported positive cases of COVID-19 among student-athletes or staff since practices resumed. Amidst a spike in cases in the Southern U.S. since late-June, several state governors, including Asa Hutchinson of Arkansas, Georgia's Brian Kemp, and South Carolina's Henry McMaster, have warned that football season could be threatened if cases do not subside in time.

On July 13, it was announced that the Patriot League would not be participating in a football season this year, however, the United States Military Academy as well as the Naval Academy were not included in the settlement as their school superintendent was in charge of making decisions regarding whether their athletic programs would have their seasons.

On July 16, the NCAA released a series of recommendations regarding protocols for fall sports, including that all participants in "high contact risk sports" be tested with results within 72 hours of play. President Emmert noted, however, that the guidelines presumed that the infection rate would be "manageable", and that "If there is to be college sports in the fall, we need to get a much better handle on the pandemic." The American Athletic Conference announced the same day that it will adhere to this protocol; commissioner Mike Aresco stated that "with the proper quarantine and the proper canvassing of close contacts, we think at this point it would be safe to play games." On July 18, the SEC announced that it would still honor scholarships for players who opt out of the fall season due to safety concerns.

On July 28, by request of the Football Oversight Committee, the NCAA announced that it had issued a blanket waiver to allow any team to play in "Week 0", in order to allow for greater scheduling flexibility amid changing conditions.

On August 12, members of the NCAA Division I council met and discussed eligibility for student-athletes. They recommended to the Division I board that athletes should be granted an extension on their 5-year eligibility due to the pandemic.

In the event that conditions would not improve by the traditional timeframe of football season, the possibility of delaying the football season entirely to spring 2021 was suggested by several coaches. However, it was largely considered by them to be a last resort. Aresco commented that such a delay would likely require practices to be held over the winter indoors—environments that have been shown to exacerbate spread of COVID-19.

Conference responses 
All of the Power Five conferences initially announced that they would go on with their season as scheduled, but with cuts to non-conference games in order to overcome logistical concerns and reduce interstate travel. The Big Ten, Pac-12, and SEC were all limiting play to in-conference opponents only. The ACC and Big 12 would allow one non-conference game each, with the ACC restricting them to in-state opponents. The ACC also suspended the use of divisions, with the top two teams in conference play by winning percentage advancing to the ACC Championship Game.

The restrictions complicated matters for FBS independents; the first four games of the BYU Cougars were all against Big Ten and Pac-12 teams, while Notre Dame lost three of its marquee games of the season—including one against Wisconsin that was to be played at Lambeau Field, and traditional rivalry games against Stanford (not held for the first time since 1996) and USC (postponed for the first time since 1945 due to World War II). Notre Dame and Navy had also canceled a planned international game in Dublin, Ireland, and tentatively rescheduled it for Navy–Marine Corps Memorial Stadium. Some FCS conferences (such as the Patriot League) have canceled or postponed the football season outright, affecting games against FBS opponents.

On July 29, the ACC announced that Notre Dame (which is an ACC member in all other sports outside of football and men's ice hockey, the latter a sport not sponsored by the ACC) would participate as a member of the conference for the 2020 season, being incorporated into its scheduling model (including 10 games against ACC opponents, expanding from six already scheduled) and being eligible to compete for the conference championship. Notre Dame pooled its media rights revenue from NBC with that of the ACC's other media rights, and was eligible to receive a share of the total revenue.

Among the Group of Five conferences, Conference USA announced on August 7 that it had approved an eight-game schedule with up to four non-conference games. The next day, however, the Mid-American Conference (MAC) announced the postponement of all fall sports for the 2020 season, including football. The conference stated that it would pursue attempts to play in spring 2021. With this decision, the MAC became the first FBS conference to cancel or postpone the football season. Commissioner Jon Steinbrecher stated that "there are simply too many unknowns to put our student-athletes into situations that are not clearly understood." The cancellation of non-conference games by the Power Five conferences—especially the Big Ten—was also expected to have a financial impact on its schools, with the Big Ten games alone expected to bring $11 million.

In the wake of the decision, ESPN reported on August 9 that the commissioners of the Power Five conferences had held an emergency meeting to discuss possible options for fall sports, amid the worsening state of the pandemic in the United States. On August 10, the Mountain West Conference (MWC) followed the MAC as the second Group of Five conference to postpone fall sports indefinitely. Despite the postponement, Air Force will still contest the Commander-in-Chief's Trophy games against Navy and Army.

On August 11, the Big Ten became the first Power Five conference to postpone fall sports, followed shortly thereafter by the Pac-12. The Nebraska Cornhuskers of the Big Ten disclosed an intent to attempt non-conference play in the fall, although the logistical aspects of such a move (including scheduling) and possible repercussions within the conference were unknown. Commissioner Kevin Warren confirmed that Nebraska could not do so as a member of the Big Ten. A major factor in the Big Ten's decision was cardiovascular complications from the virus, while the Pac-12 cited that rapid testing capabilities would be needed to resume play.

Following the decisions, the ACC, Big 12, and SEC all issued statements affirming their intent to play as scheduled in the fall. The Big Ten's decision became politicized, with President Donald Trump having criticized closures of university campuses, and having pushed in particular for the Big Ten to play in the fall. After the decision to postpone the season, the Big Ten formed a taskforce to investigate options for a return to play.

On September 16, the Big Ten approved an eight-game conference season that would begin October 24, and conclude on December 19 with cross-division matchups between each seed (with the game between the top seeds played as the Big Ten Championship Game). The conference is instituting a daily antigen testing protocol beginning September 30; PCR tests will be used to confirm positives found via antigen testing. Players who test positive on both tests will be removed from play for at least 21 days and undergo cardiac tests during this period, and will have to be cleared by a cardiologist before they can return to play. Positivity rates among participating teams and the local population will also be a factor: teams with a positivity rate above 5% or a population positivity rate above 7% will be required to halt all activity for seven days.

In response to the Big Ten's reversal, Pac-12 commissioner Larry Scott stated that the conference was awaiting authorization by health officials in California and Oregon to resume full-contact practices, and that it was also monitoring the air quality impact of ongoing wildfires in the western United States. The conference secured a provider for rapid testing earlier in the month. On September 24, the Pac-12 officially announced that it would allow football, basketball, and winter sports seasons to resume, with plans to play a seven-game conference season beginning on November 6, and concluding with the Pac-12 Championship Game on December 18.

The same day, the Mountain West announced that it too had approved an eight-game conference season beginning October 24. The next day, the MAC unanimously approved a six-game season beginning in November.

On November 19, the Pac-12 lifted a restriction on non-conference home games.

Impact on the postseason 
On July 15, the Rose Parade was canceled due to the pandemic. The same day, the NCAA announced that FBS teams would be permitted to count two wins against FCS teams, instead of the usual one, towards bowl eligibility. The NCAA later waived bowl eligibility requirements for the 2020–21 bowl season.

On August 5, the College Football Playoff (CFP) announced that it would delay the announcement of its final rankings and matchups for the Rose Bowl and Sugar Bowl from December 6 to December 20, in order to accommodate conferences that had delayed their championship games to mid-December. The CFP announced that it would still go on as scheduled, with only the teams playing in the fall being eligible for consideration in its rankings.

The voting deadline for the Heisman Trophy was similarly pushed back to December 21, with the presentation likewise scheduled for January 5, 2021. On November 14, the in-person presentation was canceled (its previous site, the PlayStation Theater in New York City, had also closed at the beginning of the year). The presentation was moved to ESPN's studio in Bristol, Connecticut, scheduled as a television-only event with finalists and past winners appearing via remote interviews.

Several bowl games were canceled due to the pandemic, while others, including the Fiesta Bowl and Rose Bowl, were restricted to being played behind closed doors without fans due to local health orders. On December 19, the Pasadena Tournament of Roses Association announced that the Rose Bowl would be re-located to AT&T Stadium in Arlington, Texas (typically the host of the Cotton Bowl Classic), citing rising cases in the state of California, and state health officials denying a request to allow at least the family members of players to attend. The Tournament of Roses Association stated that it was unclear whether they will still be allowed to refer to the game as the "Rose Bowl", as doing so will require permission from the city of Pasadena under their Master License Agreement.

Player responses 
Several players from the Pac-12 announced a unity group titled #WeAreUnited to negotiate with the conference and league with specific demands in regards to the 2020 football season. Including some players willing to boycott if their ultimatum was not satisfied. Players from the Big Ten, created a similar unity which calls for increase in testing and safety protocols.

Clemson quarterback Trevor Lawrence sparked a trend on Twitter with the hashtag, #WeWantToPlay, on August 9. Other players such as Justin Fields (Ohio State), Najee Harris (Alabama), and Chuba Hubbard (Oklahoma State), help contribute to make the hashtag No. 1 in the United States on Twitter. President Donald Trump shared Lawrence's tweet, stating "The student-athletes have been working too hard for their season to be cancelled." as well using the #WeWantToPlay hashtag. Later #WeAreUnited and #WeWantToPlay merged with players across the Power 5, with the goal of creating a union. Nick Saban joins other coaches, Jim Harbaugh and Ryan Day, by joining the movement, by stating players will be safer from the virus together as a team than at home.

Eight Nebraska players sued the Big Ten in late-August 2020, claiming that the conference's council did not actually vote on postponing the football season.

Teams opting out 
The newly independent UConn Huskies announced that they would opt out of the 2020 season.
The Old Dominion Monarchs of Conference USA announced that they would opt out of the 2020 season.
Independent New Mexico State Aggies announced that they would opt out of playing fall football and try to play in spring 2021.
Independent UMass Minutemen initially announced that they would opt of playing fall football and hoped to construct a season in spring 2021, but the university reversed the decision in late September and announced its intention to play beginning in mid-October.

Attendance restrictions 
Some teams announced that they tentatively planned to allow spectators at their games at a percentage of normal capacity, such as the Texas Longhorns (Darrell K Royal–Texas Memorial Stadium was already to have slightly reduced capacity this season due to renovations) and the North Carolina Tar Heels. All events held in the state of New York, as well as all Big Ten and Pac-12 games, were played behind closed doors. The Big Ten and Pac-12 bans applied even if spectators were otherwise allowed under local health orders.

The Army Black Knights and Navy Midshipmen's home games were closed to the public, with attendance limited to their cadets and midshipmen respectively. On October 23, it was announced that the Army–Navy Game would be re-located from Philadelphia's Lincoln Financial Field to Michie Stadium—the Black Knights' home stadium at the U.S. Military Academy in West Point—citing Pennsylvania state restrictions on gatherings that would prevent the cadets and midshipmen from attending. As with their home games, attendance was limited to the academies' student bodies. It marked the first Army–Navy Game not played at a neutral site since 1943.

Postponed or canceled games

Stadiums

Upcoming
 The 2020 season was the first for South Alabama at Hancock Whitney Stadium replacing Ladd–Peebles Stadium. The team was scheduled to play its first game there on September 12 against Grambling State. The Senior Bowl postseason all-star game (which had been played at Ladd–Peebles) also moved to the new stadium for this season's edition in January 2021.
 The 2020 season was the last season for UAB at Legion Field before moving to Protective Stadium on the grounds of the Birmingham–Jefferson Convention Complex in 2021. The Blazers played their final game at Legion Field on October 23 against Louisiana.
 The 2020 season was the first for UNLV at Allegiant Stadium replacing Sam Boyd Stadium. The team was scheduled to play its first game there on August 29 against California.

Renamed
 Georgia State renamed their stadium to Center Parc Stadium in a naming rights agreement with the Atlanta Postal Credit Union.
UCF renamed their stadium to Bounce House. Their previous naming rights deal with Charter Spectrum expired after the 2019 season. A potential naming rights deal with RoofClaim.com was vetoed by the Florida Legislature.

Kickoff games
All kickoff games were canceled due to the COVID-19 pandemic.

"Week Zero"
The regular season was scheduled to begin on August 29 with various "Week 0" games, but all were canceled due to the COVID-19 pandemic. There were two especially notable Week Zero games:

Originally, Marshall was set to play at East Carolina, to honor the 50th anniversary of the plane crash that killed 75 people, including 37 from the Marshall University football team. The crash occurred as the Thundering Herd were returning from a game at East Carolina.

Additionally, the Emerald Isle Classic at Aviva Stadium in Dublin, Ireland was scheduled to occur during Week 0, featuring Navy versus Notre Dame. However, on June 2, 2020, the game was moved from Dublin to Navy–Marine Corps Memorial Stadium in Annapolis, Maryland. Eventually, the game was canceled altogether. The game would have been be the first in the history of the Navy–Notre Dame football rivalry to be played at Navy's home stadium. The series will resume in 2021.

Week 1
The majority of FBS teams were scheduled to open the season on Labor Day weekend. However, most conferences delayed the start of their seasons due to the COVID-19 pandemic. For example, the ACC and Big 12 conferences were scheduled to begin play the weekend of September 12, while the SEC conference began conference-only play the weekend of September 26.

Four neutral-site "kickoff" games were scheduled to be held but were also canceled.
Texas Kickoff (NRG Stadium, Houston): Baylor vs. Ole Miss
Chick-fil-A Kickoff Games (Mercedes-Benz Stadium, Atlanta):
Florida State vs. West Virginia
Georgia vs. Virginia
Advocare Classic (AT&T Stadium, Arlington): Alabama vs. USC

Week 2
Chick-fil-A Kickoff Game (Mercedes-Benz Stadium, Atlanta): Auburn vs. North Carolina

Regular season top 10 matchups
Rankings reflect the AP Poll. Rankings for Week 13 and beyond listed College Football Playoff Rankings first and AP Poll second. Teams that failed to be a top 10 team for one poll or the other will be noted.
Week 5
No. 4 Georgia defeated No. 7 Auburn, 27–6 (Sanford Stadium, Athens, Georgia)
Week 6
No. 1 Clemson defeated No. 7 Miami (FL), 42–17 (Memorial Stadium, Clemson, South Carolina)
Week 7
No. 2 Alabama defeated  No. 3 Georgia, 41–24 (Bryant–Denny Stadium, Tuscaloosa, Alabama)
Week 10
No. 4 Notre Dame defeated No. 1 Clemson, 47–40, 2OT (Notre Dame Stadium, South Bend, Indiana)
No. 8 Florida defeated No. 5 Georgia, 44–28 (TIAA Bank Field, Jacksonville, Florida)
 Week 12
  No. 3 Ohio State defeated No. 9 Indiana, 42–35 (Ohio Stadium, Columbus, Ohio)
 Week 15
  No. 1/1 Alabama defeated No. 7/11 Florida, 52–46 (2020 SEC Championship Game, Mercedes–Benz Stadium, Atlanta, Georgia)
  No. 3/4 Clemson defeated No. 2/2 Notre Dame, 34–10 (2020 ACC Championship Game, Bank of America Stadium, Charlotte, North Carolina)
  No. 10/12 Oklahoma defeated No. 6/8 Iowa State, 27–21 (2020 Big 12 Championship Game, AT&T Stadium, Arlington, Texas)

Upsets
This section lists instances of unranked teams defeating ranked teams during the season.

Regular season
During the regular season, 33 unranked teams defeated a ranked team. The highest-ranked teams that lost to an unranked opponent were No. 3 Oklahoma in week 4 and No. 5 North Carolina in week 7. Rankings are based on the AP Poll at the time the game was played.

Bowl games
During the bowl season, five unranked teams defeated a ranked team. Rankings in this section are based on the final CFP rankings released on December 20.

Conference standings

Conference summaries

CFP College Football Playoff participant

Rankings

The top 25 from the AP and USA Today Coaches Polls.

Pre-season polls

CFB Playoff final rankings

In December 2020, the College Football Playoff selection committee will announce its final team rankings for the year.

Final rankings

Postseason

The NCAA waived bowl eligibility requirements for the 2020–21 bowl season, intended "to allow as many student-athletes as possible the opportunity to participate in bowl games this year." On October 30, the postseason lineup of bowl games was announced; 37 bowls were scheduled, including the National Championship game. Subsequent cancellations resulted in a schedule of 33 games, as compared to 40 games contested during the prior bowl season. On December 20, after final CFP standings were released, an additional four games were left without teams available to play, leaving the count at 29. On December 22, the Gasparilla Bowl was canceled after the South Carolina team had an increase in COVID-19 cases.  On December 27, the Music City Bowl was canceled due to Missouri's high positive COVID-19 numbers. On December 29, the Texas Bowl was canceled, due to TCU's COVID-19 issues.

{| class="wikitable" style="text-align:left; font-size: 95%"
|-
| align=center|2019–20 FBS bowl count || 40 || including the National Championship game
|-
| Canceled, prior to team selections || −9 || Bahamas, Frisco, Hawaii, Holiday, Quick Lane, Redbox, Pinstripe, Sun, Las Vegas
|-
| Canceled, due to lack of teams || −4 || Birmingham, Independence, Guaranteed Rate, Military
|-
| Canceled, after team selections || −3 || Gasparilla Bowl, Music City, Texas
|-
| New bowls debuting in 2020 || +1 || Myrtle Beach Bowl
|-
| Debuts postponed to 2021 || — || Fenway Bowl, LA Bowl
|-
| Substitute bowl for this season || +1 || Montgomery Bowl
|-
! 2020–21 FBS bowl count || 26 ||
|}

Awards and honors

Heisman Trophy
The Heisman Trophy is given to the year's most outstanding player.

 DeVonta Smith, WR, Alabama
 Trevor Lawrence, QB, Clemson
 Mac Jones, QB, Alabama
 Kyle Trask, QB, Florida

Other overall
 AP Player of the Year: DeVonta Smith, WR, Alabama
 Lombardi Award (top player): Zaven Collins, LB, Tulsa
 Maxwell Award (top player): DeVonta Smith, WR, Alabama
 SN Player of the Year: DeVonta Smith, WR, Alabama
 Walter Camp Award (top player): DeVonta Smith, WR, Alabama

Special overall
 Burlsworth Trophy (top player who began as walk-on): Jimmy Morrissey, C,  Pittsburgh
 Paul Hornung Award (most versatile player): DeVonta Smith, WR, Alabama 
 Jon Cornish Trophy (top Canadian player): John Metchie III, WR, Alabama
 Campbell Trophy ("academic Heisman"): Brady White, QB, Memphis
 Wuerffel Trophy (humanitarian-athlete): Teton Saltes, OL, New Mexico
 Senior CLASS Award (senior student-athlete): Kekaula Kaniho, CB, Boise State

Offense
Quarterback

 Davey O'Brien Award: Mac Jones, Alabama
 Johnny Unitas Golden Arm Award (senior/4th year quarterback): Mac Jones, Alabama
 Manning Award: Mac Jones, Alabama

Running back

 Doak Walker Award: Najee Harris, Alabama

Wide receiver

 Fred Biletnikoff Award: DeVonta Smith, Alabama

Tight end

 John Mackey Award: Kyle Pitts, Florida

Lineman:

 Rimington Trophy (center): Landon Dickerson, Alabama
Outland Trophy (interior lineman on either offense or defense): Alex Leatherwood, OT, Alabama
Joe Moore Award (offensive line): Alabama

Defense
 Bronko Nagurski Trophy (defensive player): Zaven Collins, LB, Tulsa
 Chuck Bednarik Award (defensive player): Zaven Collins, LB, Tulsa
 Lott Trophy (defensive impact): Paddy Fisher, LB, Northwestern

Defensive front

 Dick Butkus Award (linebacker): Jeremiah Owusu-Koramoah, Notre Dame
 Ted Hendricks Award (defensive end):

Defensive back

 Jim Thorpe Award: Trevon Moehrig, TCU

Special teams
 Lou Groza Award (placekicker): José Borregales, Miami (FL)
 Ray Guy Award (punter): Pressley Harvin III, Georgia Tech
 Jet Award (return specialist): Avery Williams, Boise State
 Patrick Mannelly Award (long snapper): Thomas Fletcher, Alabama
 Peter Mortell Holder of the Year Award: Spencer Jones, Oklahoma

Coaches
 AFCA Coach of the Year: Tom Allen, Indiana
 AP Coach of the Year: Jamey Chadwell, Coastal Carolina
 Bobby Dodd Coach of the Year: Pat Fitzgerald, Northwestern 
 Eddie Robinson Coach of the Year: Jamey Chadwell, Coastal Carolina
 George Munger Award: Jamey Chadwell, Coastal Carolina
 Home Depot Coach of the Year: Jamey Chadwell, Coastal Carolina
 Paul "Bear" Bryant Award: Nick Saban, Alabama
 Walter Camp Coach of the Year: Jamey Chadwell, Coastal Carolina

Assistants
 AFCA Assistant Coach of the Year: Randy Bates, DC, Pittsburgh
 Broyles Award: Steve Sarkisian, OC, Alabama

All-Americans

Coaching changes

Preseason and in-season
This is restricted to coaching changes taking place on or after May 1, 2020, and will also include any changes announced after a team's last regularly scheduled game but before its bowl game. For coaching changes that occurred earlier in 2020, see 2019 NCAA Division I FBS end-of-season coaching changes.

End of season
This list includes coaching changes announced during the season that did not take effect until the end of the season.

Television viewers and ratings

Most-watched regular season games

Conference championship games

Most watched non-CFP bowl games

College Football Playoff

See also

 2020–21 NCAA Division I FCS football season
 2020 NAIA football season

Notes

References

 
NCAA Division I FBS football season